Hans-Joachim Walde (28 June 1942 – 18 April 2013) was a West German track and field athlete. He competed in the decathlon at the 1964, 1968 and 1972 Olympics and won a bronze medal in 1964 and a silver in 1968.

Walde won national decathlon titles in 1964 and 1969, and set a world record the heptathlon in 1970. For several years he was the athlete's speaker of the German National Team. After retiring from competitions Walde became an orthopedic surgeon. He first specialized in general traumas, but then switched to sports medicine, in particular to shoulder surgery. He was a member of the German Shoulder and Elbow Society (DVSW) and director of sports medicine at Northwest Hospital in Frisian Sanderbusch, Lower Saxony. His son Hendrik also competed in decathlon.

References

1942 births
2013 deaths
People from Lubin County
Sportspeople from Lower Silesian Voivodeship
West German decathletes
Olympic silver medalists for West Germany
Olympic bronze medalists for the United Team of Germany
Athletes (track and field) at the 1964 Summer Olympics
Athletes (track and field) at the 1968 Summer Olympics
Athletes (track and field) at the 1972 Summer Olympics
Olympic athletes of West Germany
Olympic athletes of the United Team of Germany
European Athletics Championships medalists
Medalists at the 1968 Summer Olympics
Medalists at the 1964 Summer Olympics
Olympic silver medalists in athletics (track and field)
Olympic bronze medalists in athletics (track and field)
Universiade medalists in athletics (track and field)
Universiade gold medalists for West Germany
Medalists at the 1967 Summer Universiade